2,3-Dihydroxybenzoic acid is a natural phenol found in Phyllanthus acidus and in the aquatic fern Salvinia molesta. It is also abundant in the fruits of Flacourtia inermis. It is a dihydroxybenzoic acid, a type of organic compound.
The colorless solid occurs naturally, being formed via the shikimate pathway. It is incorporated into various siderophores, which are molecules that strongly complex iron ions for absorption into bacteria.  2,3-DHB consists of a catechol group, which upon deprotonation binds iron centers very strongly, and the carboxylic acid group by which the ring attaches to various scaffolds through amide bonds. A famous high affinity siderophore is enterochelin, which contains three dihydroxybenzoyl substituents linked to the depsipeptide of serine.

It is a potentially useful iron-chelating drug and has antimicrobial properties.

2,3-Dihydroxybenzoic acid is also a product of human aspirin metabolism.

References 

Dihydroxybenzoic acids
Salicylic acids
Chelating agents
Catechols